Steve Bizasène (born 24 April 1970 in Pointe-à-Pitre) is a Guadeloupean professional football player and manager.

In 1991, he began his career for the AS Beauvais. In Summer 1998 he transferred to the ES Wasquehal. In July 2002 he moved to US Lesquin.

In 2006, he made his debut for the Guadeloupe national football team.

Since September 2012 he is a head coach of the Guadeloupe national football team.

International career

International goals
Scores and results list Guadeloupe's goal tally first.

References

External links

Profile at Soccerpunter.com

1970 births
Living people
People from Pointe-à-Pitre
Guadeloupean footballers
French footballers
Guadeloupe international footballers
Association football midfielders
AS Beauvais Oise players
Guadeloupean football managers
French football managers
Guadeloupe national football team managers
US Lesquin players
Wasquehal Football players